Formerly, the tallest structure in Australia was the Omega Navigational Mast Woodside in Woodside, Victoria. 
The Omega Tower was demolished by Liberty Industrial on behalf of the Department of Defence on 22 April 2015 following the death of a young base jumper in 2014 after his parachute failed to open.

Tallest buildings and structures

This is a list of the tallest structures in Australia. This list contains guyed masts, towers, skyscrapers and chimneys with a height of 200 metres or more.

See also
 List of tallest buildings in Australia
 List of tallest buildings in Adelaide
 List of tallest buildings in Brisbane
 List of tallest buildings in Canberra
 List of tallest buildings in Chatswood
 List of tallest buildings in Darwin
 List of tallest buildings on the Gold Coast
 List of tallest buildings in Hobart
 List of tallest buildings in Melbourne
 List of tallest buildings in Parramatta
 List of tallest buildings in Perth
 List of tallest buildings in Sydney
 List of tallest buildings in Oceania

External links
SkyscraperPage

 
Australia

ru:Список самых высоких зданий Австралии